Wormeldange-Haut ( or (locally)) is a small town in the commune of Wormeldange, in south-eastern Luxembourg.  , the town has a population of 509.

Wormeldange
Towns in Luxembourg